The Salt Valley is a wide open area in the Rupshu region, a valley in southeast Ladakh, India. The valley has a length of about 20 km and a maximum width of about 7 km. Its average elevation is 5,000 m. It can be approached from Leh across the Tanglang La pass.

References

Geography of Ladakh
Valleys of Ladakh

simple:Salt Valley